Professional baseball in Taiwan started with the founding of the Chinese Professional Baseball League (CPBL) in 1989. At its 1997 peak, Taiwan had two leagues and 11 professional teams. The competing Taiwan Major League ran from 1997 until its absorption by the CPBL in 2003.

The professional game has had several game-fixing scandals which had led to sharp declines in game attendance. However, as of 2016 baseball in Taiwan had begun to see a renewed interest in the sport in spite of this setback due to major cheating scandals.

Historical background

The first official indigenous baseball team in Taiwan was formed in 1906, when the island was a Japanese colony, by the Middle School of the Taiwan Governor-General's National Language School (present-day Jianguo Senior High School).

The first organized baseball game was played between this team and the team of the Normal School of the Taiwan Governor-General's National Language School (present-day Taipei Municipal University of Education). From 1906 through the mid 1920s, Taiwan's baseball teams consisted mainly of Japanese players. Taiwanese did not become actively involved in the sport until the formation of the "Neng-Gao Club" in the mid 1920s, and the Kano baseball team in the early 1930s.

Taiwan's dominance in international baseball was demonstrated when the men's team won top three medals across all levels of baseball in 2022, including the U-12, U-15, U-18, U-23, and Baseball5 competitions, the only team to do so in baseball history. Taiwan's men's baseball team and women's baseball team are world No.2 in the WBSC Rankings as of December 2021.

The CPBL

The Chinese Professional Baseball League was founded in 1989 with four teams and grew to seven. As of 2009, however, there were just four teams competing for the championship of the Taiwan Series.

Since 2005, the winner of the Taiwan Series represents Taiwan in the Asia Series, competing with the championship teams of Japan and South Korea, and with China's professional leagues.

The TML

The Taiwan Major League was founded in 1997 by the chairman of TVBS, a popular cable TV channel company, after it lost the nine-year (1997 to 2006) broadcasting rights for CPBL games to Videoland Television Network. TVBS had held the broadcasting rights from 1993 to 1996.

The TML was meant to compete with the CPBL, but after 6 years of financial losses, it merged with the CPBL in 2003.

Exporting talent
Taiwan has produced great baseball talent, but its best players usually leave for the higher salaries offered by professional teams in Japan, the United States or Canada. In the 1980s, Taiwanese pitchers Tai-Yuan Kuo and Katsuo Soh (莊勝雄) posted impressive numbers at the Seibu Lions and Chiba Lotte Marines, in Japan's Nippon Professional Baseball. Young stars, such as outfielder Chin-Feng Chen and pitchers Chien-Ming Wang, Chin-Hui Tsao, and Hong-Chih Kuo, became the first group of Taiwanese players to play for teams in North American Major League Baseball.

See also
Chinese Professional Baseball League
Taiwan Major League
Taiwan Series
Konami Cup Asia Series
Chinese Taipei baseball team
Professional baseball in Japan
Baseball in South Korea
Sport in Taiwan

References

Further reading 
 Yu, Junwei. Playing in Isolation: A History of Baseball in Taiwan. Lincoln, Nebraska: University of Nebraska Press, 2007. .

External links 
 Taiwanese Baseball Primer
 Taiwan Culture Portal: The CPBL roller coaster and the future of Taiwan baseball 

Baseball in Taiwan

ko:중화직업봉구연맹
ja:中華職業棒球聯盟
zh:中華職棒